The Djaŋu, otherwise written as Djangu and Django, are an Aboriginal Australian people of the area of Arnhem Land in Australia's Northern Territory. Their society is divided into two clans, the Waramiri and Man:atja.

Name
As with the Yolngu categories generally, the determining factor for identifying the Djaŋu as a distinct tribal group is based on the shared use in its various dialects of the defining word for the demonstrative pronoun "this".

Language
The Djaŋu dialect belongs to the Yolŋu language family.

Country
The precise extent of Djaŋu country cannot be measured, given the fluid nature of the concept of tribal land in the area, but generally the live on the eastern coastland of Arnhem Bay, northwards as far as the English Company Islands.

Social organisation
Djaŋu society is organised in two clans, both belonging to the Yirritja moiety
 Man:atja (Man(d)atja)
 Waramiri (Warramiri, Warameri, Warumeri, Warranting, Burada, Buratha, Budalpudal, Buralbural)

Alternative names
 Django.

Notes

Citations

Sources

Yolngu